Chamberlain USFS Airport  is a public use airport located at Chamberlain Guard Station, in Idaho County, Idaho, United States. The airport is owned by the U.S. Forest Service. It is located near Chamberlain Creek in the Payette National Forest.

Facilities and aircraft 
It has two runways: 7/25 is 4,100 by 200 feet (1,250 x 61 m) with a turf and dirt surface and 15/33 is 2,700 by 140 feet (823 x 43 m) with a turf surface. For the 12-month period ending September 24, 2009, the airport had 4,000 aircraft operations, an average of 10 per day: 62.5% general aviation and 37.5% air taxi.

See also

List of airports in Idaho
List of airports in the United States

References

External links 
 Idaho Division of Aeronautics
 Topo map as of 1 July 1974 from USGS The National Map
 Idaho Airstrip Network
 

Airports in Idaho
Buildings and structures in Idaho County, Idaho
United States Forest Service
Transportation in Idaho County, Idaho